The following list catalogs song-writing and production credits for Leon Sylvers III. Sylvers began his career as a member of the group, The Sylvers. His production career took off in 1978 when he became the in house producer for SOLAR Records.

Writer credits

As writer (not as producer)

Production credits

External links
 Leon F. Sylvers III Discography at Discogs

Production discographies